Cheley Colorado Camps (also known as Cheley, Cheley Camps, and Camp Cheley) is a traditional, residential summer camp, in the Estes Park Valley. Cheley is located at three sites: Land O'Peaks Ranch in Estes Park, Colorado, which houses three girls' units, three boys' units and Trail's End Ranch for Boys and Girls in Glen Haven, Colorado. Since 1921, Cheley Colorado Camps has welcomed more than 50,000 young people from every state and more than a dozen countries, including many second, third, and fourth generation Cheley campers. Offering two traditional 4-week terms for 9-17-year-olds, a 5-night program for 7-10-year-old campers, and a family camp, Cheley hosts over 1,200 campers each summer. The camps have appeared on several "best summer camps".

History 
Cheley Colorado Camps was established on the shores of Bear Lake in Rocky Mountain National Park in 1921 by Frank Cheley. Originally, it was named the Bear Lake Trail School: An Alpine Summer Camp for Boys. In its first summer, the Bear Lake Trail School gave nine boys instruction on outdoor subjects such as camping, forestry, botany, birds, geology, orienteering, horsemanship, and more. In 1926, Frank Cheley opened Camp Chipeta, “a vigorous camp for vigorous girls,” named for the wife of Chief Ouray, chief of the Ute tribe. Following the success of Camp Haiyaha and Camp Chipeta, Frank Cheley sought to provide campers with a more rustic experience. In 1937, he opened Boys' Trail's End (BTE) and, in 1941, he opened Girl's Trail's End. With Frank Cheley's death in 1941, his son, Jack, and his wife, Sis, led camp for 40 years. They then entrusted its leadership to their son, Don, and his wife, Carole. As of 2005, Cheley Colorado Camps remained under family leadership with the two oldest members of the fourth generation, Jeff and Brooke.

The Code of Living 
Frank Cheley realized that the values he saw as relevant to society and young people in the 1920s may not necessarily apply to the community decades, even a century, later. Instead, Frank built a core system of values that evolves with society. The 'Code of Living' is a compilation of traits, suggested by the campers in each unit, that the campers strive to uphold throughout the term. These ideals are interwoven into the camp experience. Every term every summer, each unit, unit staff, and support staff form their own Code of Living. While each Code may differ in its physical form, most often the Code of Living is a written – and signed – set of standards and values (e.g., traits like respect, integrity, grit).

The Blue Kerchief 
The 'Blue Kerchief' (or BK) represents the Code of Living, and a symbol of commitment to the Cheley Experience. All campers and staff receive a BK during the Blue Kerchief Ceremony.

Citizenship Recognitions 
Citizenship awards are the final recognitions in any unit, voted on at the end of the camp session by counselors and other campers. They recognize campers for living by the Code of Living, helping others, assisting counselors, and conducting themselves at a high standard in all aspects of camp life. At Land O’ Peaks, they include the Silver Coup (9 to 11 year olds), Silver Spurs (12 and 13 year olds), and Gold Key (14 to 17 year olds). At Trail's End, they include the Driver of the Covered Wagon (12 and 13 year olds) and Top Hand (14 to 17 year olds).

Camp activities 
Cheley campers participate in activities such as mountain biking, whitewater rafting, paddleboarding, horseback riding, hiking, backpacking, crafts, archery, riflery, sports, high ropes, and low ropes.

Program Recognitions 
Members of the Cheley community are offered the chance to strive for recognition in the form of a patch on their BK. Program patches, awards, and other recognitions of achievement are important anchors at Cheley. They are earned not by competing with others but by individual campers challenging themselves and excelling. The early camp patches in the 1920s were colored patches representing special sets of tests and were sewn in a semicircle underneath the camp insignia on the kerchief. They were awarded for Citizenship, Horsemanship, Science, Guide, Physical Development, Mountaineer, Naturalist, First Aid, and Camp Improvement. Over the years, various patches and awards have evolved.

Program patches include hiking, outcamping, horsemanship, climbing, mountain biking, backpacking, and sleuthing. The "On the Trail" Patch is awarded for spending fifteen program days on the trail and not in camp. The Circle of Stars (for 9, 10, and 11 year olds) and the Pinecone Patch (12 and 13 year olds) indicate that a camper has participated in every camp activity.

More difficult to achieve, and requiring more than one summer, are the Trail Hand, for horseback riding achievement, and 4th Degree Tyrolean, for hiking, backpacking, and outdoor expertise. A camper who attains the height of achievement with strong proficiency in all camping skills and programs can earn the Gold Spurs recognition. It honors excellence in all areas including hiking, riding, backpacking, mountain biking, riflery, archery, and crafts over at least three terms.

Facilities 
Cheley's facilities include five horseback riding rings, a climbing wall, a gymnasium, a fleet of 40 mountain bikes, a low and high ropes course, a grassy amphitheater with a lighted stage, a soccer field beside an aspen grove, a fishing pond, and facilities for working with leather, paints, ceramics, and wood. Cheley's lodges and log cabins date back to the 1920s.

Specialty Camps

Quarter B-4 
In 2017, Cheley Colorado Camps began offering Quarter B-4, their five-night intro to the Cheley Experience as "a wonderful way for 7 to 10-year-olds to dip their toes into camp before jumping into 27-days." Campers are divided into two units: the Pikas for 7/8-year-olds and the Marmots for 9/10-year-olds.

Family Camp 
In 1985, Cheley started Family Camp so that families could capture the magic of camp together. Family Camp at Cheley Colorado Camps invites families with children age 6 and older for five days of quality family time at their Trail's End Ranch for Boys property.

Cheley/Children's Hospital Burn Camp 
Cheley Colorado Camps expanded in 1984 to include the Cheley/Children’s Hospital Burn Camp Program. The program was started to include children healing from a burn injury and give them a camp experience. The eight-day camp welcomes burn survivors from all over the world, including from the United Kingdom and Russia. Burn Camp includes day hikes, backpacking, technical climbing, horseback riding, crafts, fishing, evening campfires, songs and games, and sports. Staff members from Cheley provide the programming and counseling expertise while the Children’s Hospital Colorado team provides expertise in burn injuries and emotional/social issues. In addition, firefighters from Denver and Estes Park and burn nurses from multiple countries join the staff to help provide a spectacular experience for everyone. All campers at Cheley/Children's Hospital Burn Camp attend on scholarship due to the fundraising efforts of groups, including the Burn Foundation, Rotary Club, and Tahara Mountain Lodge. Burn Camp is held in August, following the completion of Cheley's summer programs.

Notable alumni 

 Jason Ritter, actor, voice actor, and producer
 Tyler Ritter, actor
Grant Wood, American painter
Jennifer Beals, actress and model
 Tom Hornbein, mountaineer
 Libby Schaaf, mayor of Oakland, California
 Hank Brown, American politician, lawyer, and educator
 Nancy Kassebaum, American politician
 Daryl Hannah, actress and activist
 Page Hannah, philanthropist and actress
Charlie Jones, sportscaster
 John Bucksbaum, chairman of Bucksbaum Retail Properties, LLC
 Jena Lee Nardella, author and philanthropist
 Abraham Akaka, clergyman

References 

Summer camps in Colorado
Buildings and structures in Larimer County, Colorado
History of Colorado
History of the Rocky Mountains
1921 establishments in Colorado
Estes Park, Colorado